Gordon Lake is the name of several lakes in Ontario, Canada. The largest of these is located near Rock Lake, Ontario in Parry Sound District

List of Gordon Lakes in Ontario
 Near Route 60 in Haliburton County, Ontario 
 Southeast of Kincardine, Ontario, in Bruce County, Ontario 
 Near Rock Lake in Parry Sound District 
 Near Ontario Route 520 Parry Sound District, Ontario 
 In Algoma District 
 In Algoma District 
 Sudbury 
 Timiskaming 
 Sudbury 
 Kenora 
 Thunder Bay 
 Chochrane

See also
List of lakes in Ontario

References
 National Resources Canada

Lakes of Ontario